Cloyd is the anglicized form of the Welsh Clwyd, referring to the River Clwyd in northeast Wales.

It may also refer to:

Places 
 Clwyd, the former Welsh county named for the river
 Flintshire, the English name of the same area which was known as Clwyd in Welsh

Name 
 Cloyd Boyer (born 1927), former right-handed pitcher and pitching coach in Major League Baseball
 Cloyd Head (1886–1969), Chicago playwright and theatrical director born in Oak Park, Illinois
 Cloyd H. Marvin (1889–1969), longest serving president of George Washington University, and the then-youngest American university president
 Cloyd A. Porter (born 1935), former member of the Wisconsin State Assembly
 Cloyd (surname), a surname carried by some families from the Clwyd area

Other uses 
 15499 Cloyd, an asteroid
 Battle of Cloyd's Mountain, May 1864, in the American Civil War